Driftpile is a community on the Drift Pile River 150 Indian reserve, in northern Alberta, Canada.

The locality takes its name from the Driftpile River.

References

Localities on Indian reserves in Alberta